Michael Francis Jermey (born 24 March 1964) is a British television executive, and ITV's director of news.

He attended Brasenose College, Oxford, from 1982, gaining a BA degree in PPE in 1985. He edited the student newspaper in 1984. He joined Central Television as a journalist in 1985. He joined ITN in 1986. From 1990 to 1991 he was editor of the News at Ten. From 1991 to 1993 he was head of foreign news.

In 2004 he became head of ITV's regional news operations; it has 11 of them. From 2007 to 2009 he was ITV's director of regions. He has been the director of news at ITV since 2009, and the director of sport from 2009 to 2012.

References

External links
 

1964 births
Living people
Alumni of Brasenose College, Oxford
British television journalists
ITV people